This is a list of the mammal species recorded in Kuwait. There are twenty-five mammal species in Kuwait, of which one is endangered, four are vulnerable, and one is near threatened. One of the species listed for Kuwait can no longer be found in the wild.

The following tags are used to highlight each species' conservation status as assessed by the International Union for Conservation of Nature:

Order: Sirenia (manatees and dugongs) 

Sirenia is an order of fully aquatic, herbivorous mammals that inhabit rivers, estuaries, coastal marine waters, swamps, and marine wetlands. All four species are endangered.

Family: Dugongidae
Genus: Dugong
Dugong, D. dugon

Order: Rodentia (rodents) 

Rodents make up the largest order of mammals, with over 40% of mammalian species. They have two incisors in the upper and lower jaw which grow continually and must be kept short by gnawing.
Suborder: Myomorpha
Family: Dipodidae (jerboas)
Subfamily: Allactaginae
Genus: Allactaga
 Euphrates jerboa, A. euphratica 
Family: Muridae (mice, rats, gerbils, etc.)
Subfamily: Gerbillinae
Genus: Gerbillus
 Cheesman's gerbil, Gerbillus cheesmani
 Wagner's gerbil, Gerbillus dasyurus LC
Genus: Meriones
 Sundevall's jird, Meriones crassus LC
Genus: Tatera
 Indian gerbil, Tatera indica LC

Order: Erinaceomorpha (hedgehogs and gymnures) 

The order Erinaceomorpha contains a single family, Erinaceidae, which comprise the hedgehogs and gymnures. The hedgehogs are easily recognised by their spines while gymnures look more like large rats.

Family: Erinaceidae (hedgehogs)
Subfamily: Erinaceinae
Genus: Paraechinus
 Desert hedgehog, P. aethiopicus

Order: Chiroptera (bats) 

The bats' most distinguishing feature is that their forelimbs are developed as wings, making them the only mammals capable of flight. Bat species account for about 20% of all mammals.

Family: Vespertilionidae
Subfamily: Vespertilioninae
Genus: Pipistrellus
 Kuhl's pipistrelle, Pipistrellus kuhlii LC
Family: Rhinopomatidae
Genus: Rhinopoma
 Lesser mouse-tailed bat, Rhinopoma hardwickei LC

Order: Cetacea (whales) 

The order Cetacea includes whales, dolphins and porpoises. They are the mammals most fully adapted to aquatic life with a spindle-shaped nearly hairless body, protected by a thick layer of blubber, and forelimbs and tail modified to provide propulsion underwater.
Suborder: Mysticeti
Family: Balaenopteridae
Subfamily: Balaenopterinae
Genus: Balaenoptera
 Pygmy blue whale, Balaenoptera musculus brevicauda EN
Subfamily: Megapterinae
Genus: Megaptera
Humpback whale, M. novaeangliae 
Suborder: Odontoceti
Superfamily: Platanistoidea
Family: Phocoenidae
Genus: Neophocaena
 Finless porpoise, Neophocaena phocaenoides DD
Family: Delphinidae (marine dolphins)
Genus: Sousa
 Indo-Pacific humpbacked dolphin, Sousa chinensis DD
Genus: Grampus
 Risso's dolphin, Grampus griseus DD

Order: Carnivora (carnivorans) 

There are over 260 species of carnivorans, the majority of which feed primarily on meat. They have a characteristic skull shape and dentition. 
Suborder: Feliformia
Family: Felidae (cats)
Subfamily: Felinae
Genus: Caracal
Caracal, C. caracal 
Genus: Felis
 African wildcat, F. lybica 
Sand cat, F. margarita 
Family: Herpestidae (mongooses)
Genus: Urva
Indian grey mongoose, U. edwardsii 
Family: Hyaenidae (hyaenas)
Genus: Hyaena
Striped hyena, H. hyaena , presence uncertain
Suborder: Caniformia
Family: Canidae (dogs, foxes)
Genus: Vulpes
 Rüppell's fox, V. rueppellii 
 Red fox, V. vulpes 
Family: Mustelidae (mustelids)
Genus: Mellivora
Honey badger, M. capensis

Locally extinct 
The following species are locally extinct in the country:
 Cheetah, Acinonyx jubatus
Saudi gazelle, Gazella saudiya
 Arabian oryx, Oryx leucoryx
 Leopard, Panthera pardus

See also
List of chordate orders
Lists of mammals by region
List of prehistoric mammals
Mammal classification
List of mammals described in the 2000s

Notes

References
 

Lists of mammals by country
Lists of mammals of the Middle East
mammals

mammals